Paul Sheehan may refer to:

 Paul Sheehan (golfer) (born 1977), Australian golfer
 Paul Sheehan (journalist) (born 1951), Australian journalist
 Paul Sheehan (singer), British baritone in Alban (opera)

See also
 Paul Sheahan (born 1946), cricketer